Syed Mohammad Iqbal Kazmi is a human rights activist (Correspondent of Human Rights Commission South Asia)  and journalist (Chief Editor Weekly Special Report) and is based out of city of Karachi. He is known to have registered cases against Karachi Electricity Supply Company, Pakistan Electronic Media Regulatory Authority Government of Sindh and IDPs, Mobille Courts, Special courts, Sindh High Court moved for judicial inquiry into Ashura blast, and Targate killing in Karachi. Kazmi moved in the Supreme Court of Pakistan against the beneficiaries of the National Reconciliation Ordinance (NRO) challenging the eligibility of the beneficiaries.

Kidnapping

Amnesty international reported that  Iqbal Kazmi was abducted on 6 June 2007. He was reportedly tortured and he later regained consciousness the following day 
in a park in the Clifton area of Karachi. His kidnappers told him that he would be killed unless he left the city by 12 June 2007.

On August 1, 2007, the wife of Iqbal Kazmi was kidnapped while she was on her way to high court to meet her husband who had been arrested on fraud charges on 12 June 2007. 

The Police refused to register an FIR against the assailants. However, the Additional District and Session Judge, Karachi, South, Mohammed Azeem,  the police register an FIR against those involved in the attack.

Arrest
On June 12, 2007,  Iqbal Kazmi was arrested by police in cases of cheating, and was  sent to Judicial Remand until June 16 by a judicial magistrate at the Malir Cantonment Courts.  Police stated that Mr. Qazmi had given checks to individuals that were dishonored later. Kazmi’s lawyers alleged that the cases were fabricated against him. Mrs. Sadia Kazmi also alleged that she had not been provided with the first information report about the crime. 

In court Mr Kazmi stated that he had been jailed because he had threatened that he would go on hunger strike in front of  Sindh Chief Minister house.

Iqbal kazmi was granted bail by the Sindh High court on 18 August 2007. His next hearing is expected to be heard on 22 August 2007.

See also
Human Rights in Pakistan
Supreme Court of Pakistan

External links

References

Living people
Year of birth missing (living people)